The New Bongaigaon–Guwahati section  of the Barauni–Guwahati line connects New Bongaigaon and Guwahati in the Indian state of Assam.

History

Early developments within Assam
The Assam Railway and Trading Company played a pioneering role in laying railway tracks in Assam. The first railway line in Assam, 15 miles long, was laid in 1882 between Amolapatty, Dibrugarh and Dinjam Stream for transportation of tea. It was extended up to Makum collieries at Margherita in 1884. The company also established the first passenger railway – Dibru Sadiya Railway.

Assam links pre-independence
During British rule, rail links from Assam to the rest of India were through the eastern part of Bengal. In pre-independence days, there were basically two linkages. On the western side, a metre gauge line running via Radhikapur, Biral, Parbatipur, Tista, Gitaldaha and Golokganj connected Fakiragram in Assam with Katihar in Bihar. On the eastern side, Assam was linked to Chittagong through the Akhaura–Kulaura–Chhatak line and Akhaura–Laksam–Chittagong line. Assam was linked to numerous other towns in the eastern part of Bengal through what is now the Mahisasan-Shahbajpur defunct transit point. The eastern line had been constructed in response to the demand of the Assam tea planters for a railway link to Chittagong port. Assam Bengal Railway started construction of a railway track on the eastern side of Bengal in 1891. A  track between Chittagong and Comilla was opened to traffic in 1895. The Comilla-Akhaura-Kulaura-Badarpur section was opened in 1896-1898 and finally extended to Lumding in 1903. The Assam Bengal Railway constructed a branch line to Guwahati, connecting the city to the eastern line in 1900.  During the 1900-1910 period, the Eastern Bengal Railway built the Golakganj-Amingaon branch line, thus connecting the western bank of the Brahmaputra to the western line.

Apart from the eastern and western lines, there was another link. In 1908, Eastern Bengal Railway extended the Kaunia–Dharlla line to Amingaon.

Assam  Link Project
With the partition of India in 1947, all the three links were lost and for a short period the railway system in Assam was delinked from the rest of India. Indian Railways took up the Assam Link Project in 1948 to build a rail link between Fakiragram and Kishanganj.  Fakiragram was connected to the Indian railway system in 1950 through the Indian portion of North Bengal with a metre-gauge track. The New Bongaigaon–Guwahati section was converted to  broad gauge. Broad gauge reached Guwahati in 1984.

Saraighat Bridge
The construction of the 1.49 km long Saraighat Bridge, the first rail-cum-road bridge across the Brahmaputra, was an event of great excitement. Jawaharlal Nehru, India’s first prime minister formally laid the foundation stone on 10 January 1960 and it was completed in 1962, connecting the two parts of the metre gauge railways in Assam.

Siliguri-Jogihopa-Kamakhya line
The Naranarayan Setu was constructed in 1998, thereby paving the way for linking Jogihopa with Kamakhya.

Dudhnoi-Mendipathar branch line 
The line between Dudhnoi in Assam and Deepa in Meghalaya was proposed in the Rail budget of 1992–93. Later the alignment was changed to Dudhnoi-Mendipathar in 2007 due to opposition of local people. Due to late handover of land to railways in Assam and Meghalaya, the progress of work was slow up to 2013. Acquisition of land was completed by March 2013.

This rail line is the first foray of Indian Railways into Meghalaya. Mendipathar railway station was inaugurated by the Prime minister of India, Narendra Modi on 30 November 2014, through a video feed to the ceremony gathering at Mendipathar.

Electrification
Electrification of the entire Katihar–Guwahati route is planned to be executed by 2014.

References

5 ft 6 in gauge railways in India
Rail transport in Assam
Railway lines opened in 1962
Transport in Guwahati
Transport in Bongaigaon